Anthony Sheppard (born 1956) is an Irish former hurler. At club level he played with Kilruane MacDonaghs and was also a member of the Tipperary senior hurling team.

Career

Sheppard first played Gaelic football and hurling at juvenile and underage levels with the Kilruane MacDonaghs. After winning numerous divisional titles in the minor and under-21 grades, he progressed onto the club's respective senior teams and won a combined total of 12 North Tipperary titles across both codes between 1976 and 1990. He captained Kilruane MacDonaghs to the All-Ireland Club Championship title in 1986, having earlier won four Tipperary SHC titles.
 
Sheppard first lined out at inter-county level as a forward on the Tipperary minor hurling team during the 1974 Munster MHC campaign. He later spent two seasons with the under-21 team. Sheppard first played with the senior team during their successful 1978-79 National League campaign. He made his only championship appearance when he captained the team in 1986. Sheppard was a non-playing substitute when Tipperary beat Cork in the 1987 Munster final replay.

Honours

Kilruane MacDonaghs
All-Ireland Senior Club Hurling Championship: 1986 (c)
Munster Senior Club Hurling Championship: 1985 (c)
Tipperary Senior Hurling Championship: 1977, 1978, 1979, 1985 (c)
North Tipperary Senior Hurling Championship: 1977, 1978, 1979, 1985 (c), 1986 (c), 1987, 1990
North Tipperary Senior Football Championship: 1976, 1977, 1978, 1979, 1981

Tipperary
Munster Senior Hurling Championship: 1987
National Hurling League: 1978-79

References

External link

 Tony Sheppard player profile

1956 births
Living people
Kilruane MacDonaghs hurlers
Tipperary inter-county hurlers
Hurling goalkeepers
Gaelic football goalkeepers